William Benjamin Robinson (December 22, 1797 – July 18, 1873) was a fur trader and political figure in Upper Canada.

He was born in Kingston in 1797, the son of Christopher Robinson and Esther Sayre, and moved to York (Toronto) with his family in 1798. In 1802, his mother remarried after his father's death and moved to Newmarket, where he grew up. Robinson later took over his stepfather's (Elisha Beman) mills and stores. He later joined his brother Peter in the fur trade, operating mainly in the Muskoka district. In 1830, he was elected to the Legislative Assembly of Upper Canada for Simcoe; he was reelected in 1834 and 1836. He oversaw the development of the Welland Canal starting in 1833.

In 1843, he negotiated a treaty with the Chippewas of Lake Simcoe where  were "set aside to be held in trust" for their use. In 1844, he was elected to the Legislative Assembly of the Province of Canada for Simcoe as a Tory; he held the seat until 1854, when he was reelected in South Simcoe. In December in that year, he was appointed inspector-general; he resigned the following March because he opposed William Henry Draper's bill to create a University of Upper Canada. In 1846, he was appointed chief commissioner of public works. In the assembly, he opposed the secularization of King's College and of the clergy reserves. He helped promote a railway link between the Province of Canada and the Maritimes. He opposed a proposed Separate School act for Canada West in 1855.

In 1850, he negotiated two more treaties with native leaders:
 one covering land along Lake Superior from Batchawana Bay to Pigeon River
 one which covered land from Batchawana Bay to Penetanguishene

In 1852, he became a commissioner of the Canada Company.

After the death of his wife in 1865, Robinson left Canada and returned in 1867. He died in Toronto in 1873.

His brother John Beverley was a judge and member of the Legislative Assembly and Legislative Council.

References 
 

1797 births
1873 deaths
Members of the Legislative Assembly of Upper Canada
Members of the Legislative Assembly of the Province of Canada from Canada West
Canadian fur traders